The Castel C-24 was a training glider built in the late 1930s in France. It was a glider of high-wing monoplane configuration. In English, Castel C-24 translated to Castle C-24. It was produced by the manufacturer Castel. Another product was built by the same manufacturer, with a similar name, which was called the Castel C-24S. It was also built in the late 1930s.

Specifications

References

Glider aircraft